A1 Team Malaysia is the Malaysian team of A1 Grand Prix, an international racing series.

Management 

A1 Team Malaysia is operated by A1 Team (Malaysia) Sdn. Bhd. The team was founded by Jack Cunningham, a Briton, and former Malaysian F1 driver Alex Yoong.

History

2008–09 season 

Driver: Fairuz Fauzy, Aaron Lim

Fairuz Fauzy raced for A1 Team Malaysia in 6 of the 7 rounds of the 2008-09 season winning the Sprint race at Zandvoort while Aaron Lim participated in all the rookie sessions and raced at Brands Hatch. The team finished 6th overall that season.

2007–08 season 

Drivers: Fairuz Fauzy, Alex Yoong

In comparison to previous seasons, Team Malaysia struggled. They finished 15th in the championship.

2006–07 season 

Driver: Alex Yoong

Team Malaysia continued with their form from the previous season, taking three wins en route to 6th in the championship.

At the Czech Republic race, A1 Team Malaysia won the Sprint Race giving them pole position for the Feature Race. Driver Alex Yoong went on to win the Feature Race, gaining the fastest lap in the process, meaning A1 Team Malaysia came away with maximum points.

2005–06 season 

Drivers: Fairuz Fauzy, Alex Yoong

A1 Team Malaysia finished in 5th overall, with a win at Shanghai and 2 podium places.

Drivers 
Alex Yoong while racing for the team, accumulated an A1GP series-record of 45 consecutive starts.

Complete A1 Grand Prix results 

(key), "spr" indicate a Sprint Race, "fea" indicate a Main Race.

References

External links

A1 Team Malaysia Home Page a1teammalaysia.com.my
Media Partner Pitstop.com.my

A1 Grand Prix teams
Malaysian auto racing teams
Motorsport in Malaysia
National sports teams of Malaysia
Auto racing teams established in 2005
Auto racing teams disestablished in 2009
2005 establishments in Malaysia